On May 7, 1999, during the NATO bombing of Yugoslavia (Operation Allied Force), five U.S. Joint Direct Attack Munition guided bombs hit the People's Republic of China embassy in Belgrade, killing three Chinese state media journalists and outraging the Chinese public. According to the U.S. government, the intention had been to bomb the nearby Yugoslav Federal Directorate for Supply and Procurement (FDSP). President Bill Clinton apologized for the bombing, stating it was an accident. Central Intelligence Agency (CIA) Director George Tenet testified before a congressional committee that the bombing was the only one in the campaign organized and directed by his agency, and that the CIA had identified the wrong coordinates for a Yugoslav military target on the same street. The Chinese government issued a statement on the day of the bombing, stating that it was a "barbarian act".

In October 1999, five months after the bombing, The Observer and also pointed out that The Observer/Politiken report was more widely covered internationally than in the U.S.

The story was also covered by Mother Jones, In These Times and World Socialist Web Site.

Salon interview with William M. Arkin 

A 2000 Salon article by Laura Rozen featured an interview of Washington Post columnist and former intelligence officer William M. Arkin, who stated his belief that the bombing was accidental. Rozen reported that the Chinese embassy and the Hotel Yugoslavia are across the street from each other, and that in the Hotel Yugoslavia, Željko Ražnatović owned a casino and had a headquarters. Both the Hotel Yugoslavia and the Chinese embassy were bombed the same night of May 7.

Arkin told Rozen his belief that certain people at NATO erroneously believed that signals coming from the Hotel Yugoslavia were actually coming from the Chinese embassy saying, "I think there were communications emanating from the Hotel Yugoslavia across the street. And I think that stupid people who are leaking rumors to The Observer have made that mistake."

Wreckage of shot down F-117 Nighthawk stealth fighter 

The article from The Observer in October 1999 reported that a stealth fighter had been shot down early in the air campaign and that since China lacked stealth technology, they may have been glad to trade with the Yugoslav forces.

In January 2011, the Associated Press via Fox News reported that the unveiled Chinese J-20 may have been developed in part by reverse engineering the U.S. F-117 from parts of the wreckage that were recovered.

In May 2019, BBC News reported that, "It's widely assumed that China did get hold of pieces of the plane to study its technology."

The Sunday Times report of an unpublished memoir by Jiang Zemin 

In February 2011, The Sunday Times published an article stating that an unpublished memoir by former Chinese leader Jiang Zemin recounts how Serbian forces were allowed to use the Chinese embassy, and that privately, the U.S. showed evidence of this activity to the Chinese.

International Criminal Tribunal for the former Yugoslavia (ICTY) investigation 
A report conducted by the ICTY entitled "Final Report to the Prosecutor by the Committee Established to Review the NATO Bombing Campaign Against the Federal Republic of Yugoslavia" after the Kosovo War examined the attack on the Chinese embassy specifically and came to the conclusion that the Office of the Prosecutor should not undertake an investigation concerning the bombing. In reaching its decision, it provided the following observations:
That the root of the failures in target location appears to stem from the land navigation techniques employed by an intelligence officer in an effort to pinpoint the location of the FDSP building at Bulevar Umetnosti 2. The officer used techniques known as "intersection" and "resection" which, while appropriate to locate distant or inaccessible points or objects, are inappropriate for use in aerial targeting as they provide only an approximate location. Using this process, the individual mistakenly determined that the Chinese Embassy was the FDSP headquarters.
The United States has formally apologized to the Chinese Government and agreed to pay $28 million in compensation to the Chinese Government and $4.5 million to the families of those killed or injured. The CIA has also dismissed one intelligence officer and reprimanded six senior managers. The U.S. Government also claims to have taken corrective actions in order to assign individual responsibility and to prevent mistakes such as this from occurring in the future.
The aircrew involved in the attack should not be assigned any responsibility for the fact they were given the wrong target and that it is inappropriate to attempt to assign criminal responsibility for the incident to senior leaders because they were provided with wrong information by officials of another agency.

Amnesty International report
Amnesty International examined the NATO air campaign and assessed the legality of its actions. In the case of the embassy bombing, Amnesty reported both on the official explanation and to the Observer/Politiken investigation without arbitrating as to which was true. NATO was criticised for continuing its bombing campaign uninterrupted when its safeguards to protect civilians were known to be faulty. A genuinely accidental attack would not imply legal responsibility, but the report stated that "the very basic information needed to prevent this mistake was publicly and widely available at the time" and that, "It would appear that NATO failed to take the necessary precautions required by Article 57(2) of Protocol I." Article 57(2) of Protocol I of the Geneva Conventions says that an attacker shall, "do everything feasible to verify that the objectives to be attacked are neither civilians nor civilian objects."

Aftermath

Future of the location
Marking the 10th anniversary of the bombing on May 7, 2009, Belgrade Mayor Dragan Đilas and Chinese Ambassador to Serbia Wei Jinghua dedicated a commemorative plaque at the location. The author of the plaque was Nikola Kolja Milunović. Wreaths were laid at the plaque on May 7, 2017, and also in September 2019.

During the visit of General Secretary of the Chinese Communist Party Xi Jinping to Serbia in June 2016, he and Serbian President Tomislav Nikolić visited the location, declared the nearby turnaround a Square of Serbian-Chinese Friendship and announced the construction of the Chinese Cultural Center on the location of the former embassy. The construction of the center began on July 20, 2017, in the presence of Mayor Siniša Mali and Chinese Ambassador Li Manchang. The project will cost 45 million euros.

In 2020, the Milunović plaque was replaced by a new, "modest" square memorial. While the inscription on the original plaque explained why it had been placed there and included the date of the bombing and number of victims, the new one has a generic text in Serbian and Chinese: As a token of gratitude to PR China for support and friendship in hardest moments for the people of the Republic of Serbia, and in memory of the killed. This sparked objections by the Belgraders, who called the new memorial "a shame" and a "table which says nothing", asking for the reinstatement of the old plaque.

Rise of anti-Western sentiment and warming of China-Russia relations

Within the United Nations, both China and Russia opposed military action against Yugoslavia. Strong cultural ties exist between Russia and Serbia, and the bombing campaign, along with the bombing of the Chinese embassy, led to an increase in anti-Western sentiment in both countries and a warming of China-Russia relations.

See also

 Civilian casualties during Operation Allied Force
Yinhe incident
Hainan Island incident

Notes

References

External links 

1999 in China
1999 in international relations
1999 in Serbia
1999 in the United States
Explosions in 1999
May 1999 events in Europe
1990s in Belgrade
20th-century history of the United States Air Force
China–United States military relations
Accidents and incidents involving United States Air Force aircraft
Aerial operations and battles of the Kosovo War
Airstrikes conducted by the United States
War-related deaths
People killed during the NATO bombing of Yugoslavia
Journalists killed while covering the Yugoslav Wars
Combat incidents
Attacks on diplomatic missions of China
Civilian casualties in the Kosovo War
NATO airstrikes
Incidents involving NATO
Attacks on government buildings and structures
Office buildings in Serbia
War crimes